In molecular biology, glycoside hydrolase family 4 is a family of glycoside hydrolases.

Glycoside hydrolases  are a widespread group of enzymes that hydrolyse the glycosidic bond between two or more carbohydrates, or between a carbohydrate and a non-carbohydrate moiety. A classification system for glycoside hydrolases, based on sequence similarity, has led to the definition of >100 different families. This classification is available on the CAZy web site, and also discussed at CAZypedia, an online encyclopedia of carbohydrate active enzymes.

Glycoside hydrolase family 4 CAZY GH_4 comprises enzymes with several known activities; 6-phospho-beta-glucosidase; 6-phospho-alpha-glucosidase; alpha-galactosidase; alpha-D-glucuronidase (EC 3.2.1.139). 6-phospho-alpha-glucosidase requires both NAD(H) and divalent metal (Mn2+, Fe2+, Co2+, or Ni2+) for activity.

External references
GH4 in CAZypedia

References 

EC 3.2.1
GH family
Protein families